Bondi Road is the ninth studio album by Australian-New Zealand rock band Dragon, released in April 1989. It was the last album of new material to be released during Marc Hunter's lifetime.

Track listing 
 "Young Years" (Alan Mansfield, Sharon O'Neill) – 3:58
 "Blue Blue" (Marc Hunter, Todd Hunter) – 4:16
 "Book of Love" (Johanna Pigott, T. Hunter) – 4:21
 "Here Am I"  (A. Mansfield, M. Hunter) – 5:17
 "Ice in this Town" (A. Mansfield, Sharon O'Neill) – 4:17
 "Gold in the River" (Brent Thomas, M. Hunter, Mike Caen) – 4:15
 "Bondi Road" (J. Pigott, M. Hunter, T. Hunter) – 4:07
 "Summer" (David Hirschfelder, M. Hunter, Wendy Hunter) – 3:44
 "Family Man" (D. Hirschfelder, M. Hunter) – 5:14
 "Runaway" (A. Mansfield, S. O'Neill) – 3:50
 "Good Time Girl" (A. Mansfield, S. O'Neill) – 5:03
 "Celebration" (Kool & The Gang, Ronald Bell) – 3:54

Charts

Weekly charts

Year-end charts

Certifications

Personnel 
 Backing vocals – Mary Azzopardi, Wendy Matthews
 Bass, backing vocals – Todd Hunter
 Guitar – Mike Caen 
 Keyboards – Alan Mansfield, David Hirschfelder
 Vocals – Marc Hunter  
Production
 Mixed by Carey Taylor
 Producer – David Hirschfelder,  Dragon
 Producuction assistant, engineer [Master of Midi] – Andy Sidari
 Recorded by John Harvey
 Additional recording by Adam Chapman, Andy Sidari, Carey Taylor, David Hemmings, Steve Bywaters
 Remixed by Carey Taylor
 Mix engineer – David Hemmings
 Arranged by Carey Taylor, David Hirschfelder, Dragon

References

Dragon (band) albums
1989 albums
RCA Records albums
Rock albums by New Zealand artists
Albums produced by David Hirschfelder